San Jiao ("triple burner", or "triple energizer") is a concept in traditional Chinese medicine (TCM) and acupuncture. It is the sixth organ of Fu, which is the hollow space inside the trunk of the body. In TCM, there are five solid organs and each solid organ has its counterpart in a hollow organ. For instance, the heart is considered a solid organ, and the small intestine its hollow counterpart, or Fu organ. San Jiao is believed to be a body cavity of some kind which has the ability to influence other organs, and overall health, mainly through the free movement of Qi, the fundamental energy or life force.

San Jiao means "triple burner". The upper burner relates to organs in the thorax and the breathing function. The middle burner relates to the organs top of the stomach and the digesting function. The lower burner relates to the organs below the abdomen and the urogenital functions. If the three burners function well, then the organs are in synergy. According to traditional Chinese medicine, the three burners is essential in transporting fluids throughout the body, removing itching and heat, treating swellings, and overcoming problems with various organs.

See also
Dantian
Interstitium
Qigong

References

 Kaptchuk, T.J. Chinese Medicine: The Web that has no Weaver. 2000. London: Rider.
 Keown, D "The Spark in the Machine: How The Science of Acupuncture Explains the Mysteries of Western Medicine' 2014 Singing Dragon
 Maciocia, G. The Foundations of Chinese Medicine. 2000. Churchill Livingstone.
 Wiseman, N., Ye F.  A Practical Dictionary of Chinese Medicine.1998. Paradigm Publications.

Acupuncture
Traditional Chinese medicine